The Campus is the student newspaper of the City College of New York (CCNY).

History
The newspaper was established as a weekly newspaper  when the City College of New York (CCNY), a public university in the City University of New York system, opened its St. Nicolas Heights campus in Harlem.

Students who began their career at The Campus and later became notable journalists include A. H. Raskin, Fred Hechinger, A. M. Rosenthal, and Michael Oreskes, all of whom wrote for the New York Times. Melvin J. Lasky also wrote for The Campus as a student.

Notes

External links
The Campus online

City College of New York
Newspapers published in New York City
Student newspapers published in New York (state)
Publications established in 1907